"Heart of Steel" is a song by Ukrainian electronic duo Tvorchi. The song is scheduled to represent Ukraine in the Eurovision Song Contest 2023 after winning Vidbir 2023, Ukraine's national selection.

Background and composition 
According to the band, the song warns about the dangers of nuclear warfare. In an interview, the band alluded to the purpose of the Eurovision Song Contest's creation as one of the inspirations for the song, saying that "we looked into the past of this contest. [The Eurovision Song Contest] was created after the Second World War to unite Europe. Today, while some are playing with nuclear threats, our people with steel hearts are protecting all of Europe." The song has a message of not giving up in the face of adversity, with a powerful beginning to symbolize the message. In the official music video for the song, a portal between reality and an afterlife is prominently featured, with the band saying that humanity chooses what awaits them for the future.

Production 
Band member Andrii Hutsuliak started writing "Heart of Steel" in 2022, during the Siege of Azovstal. After watching videos of the Ukrainian army defending the steel and iron works in Azovstal, he was inspired to write a song based on the determination of not giving up the area.

Eurovision Song Contest

Vidbir 2023 
The competition took place in the Maidan Nezalezhnosti metro station in Kyiv, and consisted of a final on 17 December 2022. Ten entries competed and the winner was selected through the combination of votes from a public televote and an expert jury. Ties would be decided in favour of the entries that received higher scores from the public televote.

At Vidbir, the song performed last out of the ten competing songs. Both members were dressed in costumes similar to hazmat suits, with Hutsuliak wearing a black suit and Kehinde wearing a yellow suit. A video screen behind them showed the dangers of nuclear warfare, and two background dancers also appeared, both wearing gas masks.

At Eurovision 
According to Eurovision rules, all nations with the exceptions of the host country and the "Big Five" (France, Germany, Italy, Spain and the United Kingdom) are required to qualify from one of two semi-finals in order to compete for the final; the top ten countries from each semi-final progress to the final.

Charts

References 

2022 songs
2022 singles
Eurovision songs of Ukraine
Eurovision songs of 2023
English-language Ukrainian songs